Blanca Estela Rubio (born September 15, 1969) is an American politician serving in the California State Assembly since 2016. She is a Democrat representing the 48th Assembly District, encompassing parts of the eastern San Gabriel Valley, including Baldwin Park, Covina, and Glendora. Prior to being elected to the Assembly, she was a board trustee for the Baldwin Park Unified School District, and a schoolteacher for 16 years. Rubio is a board member of the Chamber of Progress, a tech industry trade group.

Early life and education 
Blanca Rubio was born in Ciudad Juárez, Mexico and first came the United States with family to Winnie, Texas, where she lived as an undocumented immigrant. She was deported back to Juárez, returned to Los Angeles illegally in 1977 with her family, and eventually became a citizen in 1994. Her younger sister, Susan Rubio, is a member of the California State Senate. Susan Rubio was previously married to Roger Hernández, her predecessor as state senator.

Blanca received her bachelor's degree in Business Administration and master's degree in Education with a Multiple Subject Teaching Credential from Azusa Pacific University. Rubio taught elementary school in Fontana Unified School District. In 2003, she was elected to Baldwin Park Unified School District Board of Education. She served for two terms as both President and Vice President.

California State Assembly 
Rubio is the Chair of the San Gabriel Valley Legislative Caucus and Chair of the Human Services Committee and Select Committee on Domestic Violence. She co-sponsored SB 273 with her sister Susan Rubio, which would extend the statute of limitations for victims of domestic violence to 10 years from 3 years in certain cases, and require more training for police dealing with abuse victims.

2020 election results

2018 election results

2016 election results

References

External links 
 
 Campaign site
Join California Blanca Rubio
 
 

Democratic Party members of the California State Assembly
Living people
1969 births
American politicians of Mexican descent
Hispanic and Latino American state legislators in California
Hispanic and Latino American women in politics
People from Baldwin Park, California
Azusa Pacific University alumni
Women state legislators in California
21st-century American politicians
21st-century American women politicians
Undocumented immigrants to the United States